Antibiotika is the 2008 double CD by the Afrikaans South African band Fokofpolisiekar. It contains four tracks and eight music videos of previous releases with a trailer of the upcoming Fokofpolisiekar Documentary.

Track listing

Personnel 
 Francois Van Coke – vocals
 Johnny de Ridder – lead guitar
 Hunter Kennedy – back-up vocals and rhythm guitar
 Wynand Myburgh – bass
 Jaco "Snakehead" Venter – drums

External links 
 Official Band Website

Fokofpolisiekar albums
2008 EPs
2008 video albums
2008 compilation albums
Music video compilation albums